Bennett Lake is a lake located in Roseville, Minnesota, a suburb of the Twin Cities.  It occupies  acres and is known for its shore fishing.  The lake is adjacent to Roseville Central Park, the city's largest park.

A 2005 shore restoration project led to improved water quality, and the nearby Prince of Peace Lutheran Church has constructed rain gardens to restrict the flow of surface runoff into the lake.

References

Lakes of Minnesota
Lakes of Ramsey County, Minnesota
Roseville, Minnesota